Sutarjo Sugiarto (born 18 February 1937) is an Indonesian former professional tennis player.

Sugiarto competed in four Davis Cup ties for Indonesia in the 1960s, against India, Japan and the Philippines twice. He made the second round of the 1968 Australian Championships, later featuring in the doubles main draws at the French Open and US Open.

His wife is former tennis player Lita Liem Sugiarto, with whom he won a mixed doubles bronze medal at the 1966 Asian Games in Bangkok.

See also
List of Indonesia Davis Cup team representatives

References

External links
 
 
 

1937 births
Living people
Indonesian male tennis players
Asian Games bronze medalists for Indonesia
Asian Games medalists in tennis
Medalists at the 1962 Asian Games
Medalists at the 1966 Asian Games
Tennis players at the 1962 Asian Games
Tennis players at the 1966 Asian Games
21st-century Indonesian people
20th-century Indonesian people